9 Month Stretch is a 2013 French comedy film written, directed by and starring Albert Dupontel. It was nominated for six categories at the 39th César Awards including Best Film and Best Director and Best Actor for Dupontel, winning Best Actress for its co-star Sandrine Kiberlain and Best Original Screenplay.

Plot
Ariane Felder, a judge in her forties a little stuck, single, is totally reluctant to date men. On New Year's Eve 2013, strongly encouraged by her colleagues, she drinks more than enough and loses control of herself.

Six months later, Ariane discovers that she is pregnant but not sure who is the father. She first thinks that it is a judge De Bernard, an enterprising colleague who is too sweet with her. However, she conducts an investigation and discovers that the father of her child is the famous Robert Nolan, alias "Bob Nolan", lover of prostitutes and burglar multiple repeat offenders, suspected of having cut the four limbs of an old man.

Being arrested, Nolan seems to recognize the judge during an interview with her, still unaware that the child she is carrying is his. Later, on the run, he breaks into her home, surprises her attempting a "criminal" abortion by intentionally falling on her stomach from a pile of furniture. Finally, he offers a deal: he won't reveal anything about his nights if she helps him demonstrate that he's not the barbaric eye-eater who is making headlines around the world.

Cast
 Sandrine Kiberlain as Ariane Felder
 Albert Dupontel as Robert Nolan
 Nicolas Marié as Attorney Trolos
  as Judge Bernard
  as Monsieur De Lime
  as Lieutenant Édouard
 Philippe Duquesne as Doctor Toulate
 Laure Calamy as Daisy
 Terry Gilliam as Charles Meatson, Famous Man Eater
 Yolande Moreau as Bob's mother
 Bouli Lanners as policeman
 Michel Fau as gynecologist
 Jean Dujardin as sign language interpreter
 Ray Cooper as CNN journalist
 Gaspar Noé as bald inmate #1
 Jan Kounen as bald inmate #2
 Babetida Sadjo as The victim of the sink

Background
Dupontel was inspired by 10e chambre, instants d'audience, a documentary by Raymond Depardon in which judge Michèle Bernard-Requin appears.  Bernard-Requin also plays a judge in Neuf mois ferme.

Dupontel originally intended to make Neuf mois ferme his first English-language film, with Emma Thompson playing Ariane Felder.

The name of the coroner Toulate ("too late") character comes from this first intention.
He chose to name his main character Ariane in reference to Ariadne as this character loses the thread. 
Attorney Trolos' name means stutterer in Ancient Greek.

Awards

César Awards

 Best Actress (Sandrine Kiberlain)
 Best Original Screenplay

References

External links
 
Movie on Allocine

2013 films
2013 comedy films
2010s French-language films
French comedy films
Films directed by Albert Dupontel
Films featuring a Best Actress César Award-winning performance
2010s French films